Leszczanka may refer to the following places:
Leszczanka, Biała Podlaska County in Lublin Voivodeship (east Poland)
Leszczanka, Chełm County in Lublin Voivodeship (east Poland)
Leszczanka, Łuków County in Lublin Voivodeship (east Poland)